The 2021 Oman Tri-Nation Series was the 6th round of the 2019–2023 ICC Cricket World Cup League 2 cricket tournament which was played in Oman in September 2021. It was a tri-nation series between Nepal, Oman and the United States cricket teams, with the matches played as One Day International (ODI) fixtures. The ICC Cricket World Cup League 2 formed part of the qualification pathway to the 2023 Cricket World Cup.

The series was originally scheduled to take place in March 2021. In January 2021, USA Cricket named a 44-man squad to begin training in Texas ahead of the series. The following month, the Cricket Association of Nepal named a 32-man preliminary squad to begin training for the series. However, on 12 February 2021, the series was postponed due to the COVID-19 pandemic. In August 2021, Oman Cricket confirmed that the matches would take place the following month, with the International Cricket Council (ICC) announcing the full schedule shortly after.

Of the six matches that were played, host Oman won three of their fixtures, with Nepal winning two matches and the United States winning one.

Squads

The United States named Kyle Phillip as a travelling reserve player for the tour, and later named Sanjay Krishnamurthi as another reserve player. Before the first match, Aaron Jones and Jasdeep Singh were both ruled out of the US squad, with Phillip and Krishnamurthi called up to the main squad. Nepal's Dipendra Singh Airee was also ruled out of the series, after suffering an ankle injury.

Fixtures

1st ODI

2nd ODI

3rd ODI

4th ODI

5th ODI

6th ODI

References

External links
 Series home at ESPN Cricinfo

2021 in Nepalese cricket
2021 in American cricket
2021 in Omani cricket
International cricket competitions in 2021–22
Oman
Oman Tri-Nation Series
Oman
Nepalese cricket tours abroad